was a town located in Tokoro District, Abashiri Subprefecture (now Okhotsk Subprefecture), Hokkaido, Japan.

As of 2005, the town had an estimated population of 5,425 and a density of 33 persons per km2. The total area was 163.50 km2.  The name comes from the Ainu nufu-un-keshi meaning "edge of the field."  The two kanji characters in the name Tanno mean "edge" and "field."

On March 5, 2006, Tanno, along with the towns of Rubeshibe and Tokoro (all from Tokoro District), was merged into the expanded city of Kitami.

External links
Kitami City website

References

Dissolved municipalities of Hokkaido
Kitami, Hokkaido